Pólya (Hungarian for "swaddling clothes") is a surname. People with the surname include:

 Eugen Alexander Pólya (1876-1944), Hungarian surgeon, elder brother of George Pólya
 Reichel-Polya Operation, a type of partial gastrectomy developed by Eugen Pólya and Friedrich Paul Reichel
 George Pólya (1887-1985), Hungarian mathematician
 Pólya Prize (LMS), awarded by the London Mathematical Society
 Pólya Prize (SIAM), awarded by the Society for Industrial and Applied Mathematics
 Pólya Award, awarded by the Mathematical Association of America (MAA)
 Pólya enumeration theorem
 Pólya conjecture
 Hilbert–Pólya conjecture
 Pólya–Szegő inequality
 Multivariate Pólya distribution
 The Pólya–Vinogradov inequality
  (1886-1937), Hungarian graphic artist

See also
polyA, characteristic terminal sequence of mRNA

Hungarian-language surnames